The 2019–20 season covers the period from July 1 to September 18, 2019. It was the Philadelphia Fury's first professional season since the club was re-established in 2011 and their first in the National Independent Soccer Association. After playing just one match during the 2019–20 NISA season, the Fury announced that they were withdrawing from NISA until further notice.

Roster

Pre-season

Competitions

NISA
The schedule for the 2019–20 NISA season was announced on July 25, 2019. On September 18, 2019, after playing only one game against Miami FC, the Fury announced that they were withdrawing from NISA until further notice.

East Coast Standings

Matches

Squad statistics

Appearances and goals 

|-
! colspan="16" style="background:#dcdcdc; text-align:center"| Goalkeepers

|-
! colspan="16" style="background:#dcdcdc; text-align:center"| Defenders

|-
! colspan="16" style="background:#dcdcdc; text-align:center"| Midfielders

|-
! colspan="16" style="background:#dcdcdc; text-align:center"| Forwards

|-
|}

Goal scorers

Disciplinary record

References

Philadelphia Fury